Prunus xueluoensis is a species of Prunus found in Hubei and Jiangxi provinces of China. It is a shrubby tree 0.5 to 3m tall, preferring to grow at 1100 to 1500m above sea level. It is only known from three mountains; Xueluozhai, Lushan and Jinggangshan. It is morphologically similar to Prunus tomentosa and Prunus tianshanica. It differs from them by a number of features including having two to four flowers per inflorescence, many more stamens per flower, a glabrous pistil and a black fruit. Genetically, P. xueluoensis is more closely related to P. polytricha, P. jingningensis, and P. pseudocerasus.

Notes

References

xueluoensis
Endemic flora of China
Flora of Hubei
Flora of Jiangxi
Plants described in 2016